Hyperacanthus may refer to:
 Hyperacanthus (gastropod), a genus in the family Cirridae
 Hyperacanthus (plant), a genus in the family Rubiaceae